Apatemys is a member of the family Apatemyidae, an extinct group of small and insectivorous placental mammals that lived in the Paleogene of North America, India, and Europe. While the number of genera and species is less agreed upon, it has been determined that two apatemyid genera, Apatemys and Sinclairella, existed sequentially during the Eocene in North America. The genus Apatemys, living as far back as 50.3 million years ago (mya), existed through part of the Wasatchian and persisted through the Duchesnean, and Sinclairella followed, existing from the Duchesnean through the Arikareean.  Examinations of specimens belonging to the genus Apatemys suggest adaptations characteristic of arboreal mammals.

Etymology
The genus name Apatemys likely derives from the Greek apate meaning “deceit” and mys meaning “mouse”. In Greek mythology, Apate represented deceit and was one of the evil spirits released from Pandora's box. While the Greek word “mys” is used in reference to the mouse-like size of apatemyids, the relationship between the Greek word “apate” and the genus Apatemys is unknown.

Taxonomy
The family Apatemyidae has no sister taxa and has faced much disagreement regarding its origins and affinities. Apatemyids are scarce even in the faunas where they are most often discovered, and constructing valid taxonomy is challenging since the specimens are typically retrieved in small sample sizes. Early hypotheses for apatemyid affinities include relations to ungulates and rodents, but the most popular early suggestions were classifying them with Insectivora or assigning them to their own order of Apatotheria. It was later proposed that apatemyids belong to the order Cimolesta, which deemed apatemyids more closely related to carnivores than to rodents. However, the relationships of the Apatemyidae continue to be speculated, with connections to other groups like primates being proposed. More valid taxonomic information is known about the genus Apatemys and the species belonging to the genus. Apatemys has 14 sister taxa also belonging to the family Apatemyidae, including Apatemyinae, Carcinella, Eochiromys, Frugivastodon, Heterohyus, Jepsenella, Labidolemur, Russellmyinae, Russellmys, Sinclairella, Stehlinella, Teilhardella, Unuchinia, and Unuchiniinae. There are 13 species belonging to the genus Apatemys. The type species for the genus is Apatemys bellus. Apatemys bellus was named by Marsh (1872), and its type specimen (YPM 13512) consists of a mandible. The species of the genus Apatemys belong to the suborder Apatotheria, whose sister taxa are Didelphodonta, Cimolestidae, Palaeoryctida, Pantodonta, Pantolesta, Pentacodontidae, Sarcodontidae and Todralestidae.

Description
Apatemyids are highly specialized eutherian mammals prevalent throughout Tertiary deposits of North America, Europe, and India. Most apatemyids were similar in size to the extant Dactylopsila trivirgata, otherwise known as the New Guinea striped possum. A skeleton of Apatemys chardini that was found in southwestern Wyoming was measured to be 36 cm, with its tail being nearly two thirds of its total length. With a body-and-head length of 15 cm, the size of Apatemys chardini is indeed comparable to that of the New Guinea striped possum, which has an average body length of 12 cm. The skeleton of apatemyids was rather slim, and their skull was large in comparison. Other information on skull morphology has been limited due to the skulls of the few complete skeletons of the Apatemyidae being crushed. Significant postcranial adaptations include the elongated second and third digits and elongated and gracile tail. Apatemyids are also characterized by various dental features including a large and procumbent first lower incisor, a vertically oriented first upper incisor, an elongated and blade-like second lower premolar, small and narrow upper and lower cheek teeth, and the presence of an additional antero-buccal cusp and a reduced paraconid on the lower molars.

Ecology
Apatemyids were arboreal, or tree-living mammals, occupying a niche filled by the modern-day aye-aye and woodpecker. Both the woodpecker and aye-aye are capable of penetrating wood to reach invertebrates, but the aye-aye does so by poking holes in the wood using its elongated incisors and then extracting the insects using its slender third digit. The highly specialized hands and teeth of apatemyids suggest they were able to pick the larvae of wood-boring insects out of trees in a similar manner. The elongated digits II and III allowed apatemyids to reach within the tiny crevices of tree bark and extract the larvae to feed on. Other behaviors of apatemyids resembled that of the modern-day squirrel or lemur. With narrow and long clawed toes, apatemyids were adapted for grasping to trees, which is a behavior consistent with arboreal mammals.

References

Euarchontoglires
Prehistoric placental genera